Air Vice Marshal Robert P. O'Brien,  is a former senior commander in the Royal Air Force who served as Air Secretary from 1994 until his retirement in 1998.

RAF career
O'Brien joined the Royal Air Force in 1963. He became Commandant of the Joint Service Defence College in 1992, and Air Secretary in 1994 before retiring in 1998.

References

Living people
Royal Air Force air marshals
Companions of the Order of the Bath
Officers of the Order of the British Empire
Year of birth missing (living people)